Actinobole condensatum is a dwarf annual herb, endemic to Western Australia.

It produces white, cream or yellow flowers between August and October in its native range.

References

Asterales of Australia
Gnaphalieae
Eudicots of Western Australia
Taxa named by Asa Gray